Pharaoh Peaks is a  mountain with three summits located in Banff National Park in Alberta, Canada. Pharaoh Peaks are part of the Ball Range in the Canadian Rockies. The nearest higher peak is Scarab Peak,  to the southwest. The mountain's name Pharaoh was in keeping with the Egyptian theme of the immediate surrounding area, e.g., Egypt Lake, Pharaoh Lake, Mummy Lake, and Scarab Lake, which were applied in 1922 by Arthur O. Wheeler of the Interprovincial Boundary Survey. Wheeler regarded the area particularly beautiful when he wrote: "After 30 years of exploration, surveys and mapping the main ranges of the Canadian Rockies, the writer ... can safely say that outstanding among them for scenic charm and interest may be classed the group of peaks, lakes and alpine meadows of the Egypt Lake area." The mountain's name was officially adopted in 1956 when approved by the Geographical Names Board of Canada.

Geology

Like other mountains in Banff Park, Pharaoh Peaks are composed of sedimentary rock laid down during the Precambrian to Jurassic periods. Formed in shallow seas, this sedimentary rock was pushed east and over the top of younger rock during the Laramide orogeny.

Climate

Based on the Köppen climate classification, the mountain is located in a subarctic climate with cold, snowy winters, and mild summers. Precipitation runoff from the mountain drains into tributaries of the Bow River.

See also
 Geography of Alberta

References

External links
 Weather forecast: Pharaoh Peaks
 Parks Canada web site: Banff National Park

Two-thousanders of Alberta
Alberta's Rockies